Debu Vs. Debu is a DVD released by the band Maximum the Hormone on September 15, 2005. The DVD contains live content, music videos and more extras.

Track listing
Live footage
 "Hōchō Hasami Cutter Knife Dosu Kiri"
 "Rock Bankurawase"
 "Kawakita Saruin"
 "Falling Jimmy"
 "Rokkinpo Goroshi"
 "Abara Bob"
 "Uehara~Futoshi~"
 "Haiyani Spain"
 "Cefiro Radio Come Back ~ Seishun Seikai ~"
 "Anal Whiskey Ponce"
 "Rock 'N' Roll Chainsaw"
 "Rolling 1000toon"
 "Koi no Sweet Kuso Meriken"
 "Nigire Tsutsu!!"

Music videos
 "Rolling 1000toon"
 "Koi no Sweet Kuso Meriken"
 "Minoreba Rock"
 "Rock Bankurawase"
 "Hōchō Hasami Cutter Knife Dosu Kiri"
 "Rokkinpo Goroshi"

Bonus Footage
Documentary about the tour
Recording at the studio
Making of the videos
"The Challenge of Makishimamuza Ryo"
All four DVD clips from the maxi single "Rock Bankurawase/Minoreba Rock"

Maximum the Hormone albums
2005 video albums